The men's 15 kilometre freestyle at the 2017 Asian Winter Games was held on 21 February 2017 at the Shirahatayama Open Stadium in Sapporo, Japan.

Schedule
All times are Japan Standard Time (UTC+09:00)

Results
Legend
DNS — Did not start
DSQ — Disqualified

References

External links
Results at FIS website

Men 15